Melissa Leong (born 1982) is an Australian television host, freelance food writer, radio broadcaster, critic, cookbook editor and marketer.

Life and career

Leong was born in 1982 in Sydney. Her parents emigrated to Australia from Singapore.

She co-hosted The Chefs' Line with chefs Dan Hong and Mark Olive for two seasons in 2017, and 2018. As of 2020, Leong is one of the new judges for MasterChef Australia, alongside Jock Zonfrillo and Andy Allen.

In November 2020, Leong was named Who’s Sexiest Person of 2020 by Who magazine.

Personal life
Leong has had depression and anxiety throughout her life and has an autoimmune condition which has caused chronic insomnia and loss of hair.

Leong married Joe Jones in 2017. In December 2020, she announced the two have separated.

References

Living people
MasterChef Australia
1982 births
Australian people of Chinese descent
People from Sydney